Brian Ernest Owen (born 1 November 1944) is an English former footballer. He played as a winger. After a playing career that saw him play in the First Division and an FA Cup semi-final, Owen spent time as a coach, physiotherapist, assistant manager and scout for various professional clubs.

Career
Born in Harefield, Middlesex, Owen joined Watford as an apprentice when he was 17. He spent most of his playing career at Watford, playing for them in an FA Cup semi final and helping them to a Football League Third Division championship. After making 170 appearances and scoring 20 goals for the club in all competitions, he was released on a free transfer in 1970.

He later played for Colchester United, and ended his career with four games in the First Division for Wolverhampton Wanderers.

Owen's playing career ended in 1973. He spent the next eleven years coaching at Wolves, Peterborough United and Ipswich Town, before serving as a physiotherapist for Crystal Palace, Colchester United, Luton Town and the England national football team. After a brief spell as Cambridge United assistant manager in the 1992–93 season, he rejoined Colchester United in 1993. He received a benefit match from the club in 2005, and remained as a coach and scout at the club until at least 2009. More recently he has been the London scout for Hibernian FC

Honours

Club
Watford
 Football League Third Division Winner (1): 1968–69

Colchester United
 Watney Cup Winner (1): 1972

References

1944 births
Living people
People from Harefield
English footballers
Watford F.C. players
Colchester United F.C. players
Wolverhampton Wanderers F.C. players
Colchester United F.C. non-playing staff
English Football League players
Association football midfielders